Juan Carlos Portantiero (9 August 1934 – 9 March 2007) was an Argentine sociologist.

He specialized in the study of the works of Antonio Gramsci. With José Aricó and other intellectuals, he was in charge of the magazine Pasado y Presente, which holds a critical view of Marxism.

He graduated in Sociology in University of Buenos Aires, and went into exile during the last illegal military government (1976–1983) because of threats received.  He moved into Mexico, where he founded the Controversia journal.

After the return of democracy (1983), he became one of the most respected Argentine scholars and had a direct influence on politics as an advisor to Unión Cívica Radical president Raúl Alfonsín and member of the advising team dubbed Grupo Esmeralda.

He served as dean of the University of Buenos Aires Faculty of Social Sciences from 1990 to 1998.

Selected works 

 Estudios sobre los orígenes del peronismo ("Studies on the Origins of Peronism", 1970), with Miguel Murmis
 Los orígenes de la sociología clásica ("Origins of Classical Sociology", 1978) 
 Estudiantes y política en América Latina ("Students and Politics in Latin America", 1978) 
 Estado y sociedad en el pensamiento clásico ("State and Society in the Classical Thinking", 1985) 
 Ensayos sobre la transición democrática en la Argentina ("Essays on Argentina's Democratic Transition", 1987)
 ''Juan B. Justo, el patriarca socialista

References

External links
  Biography
  Juan Carlos Portantiero died at Clarín

1934 births
People from Buenos Aires
Argentine sociologists
Argentine male writers
Marxist theorists
University of Buenos Aires alumni
Academic staff of the University of Buenos Aires
2007 deaths
Deaths from kidney failure